Statistics of Emperor's Cup in the 1977 season.

Overview
It was contested by 28 teams, and Fujita Industries won the championship.

Results

1st round
Dainichi Cable Industries 4–2 Mitsui Sosen
Toyota Motors 1–5 Tokyo University of Agriculture
Teijin Matsuyama 0–2 Nippon Steel
Hitachi 0–1 Yamaha Motors
Gonohe Town Hall 2–7 Yomiuri
Fukuoka University 1–0 NTT Kinki
Waseda University 5–1 Sapporo University
Osaka University of Health and Sport Sciences 7–0 Fukui Bank
Sumitomo Metals 3–2 Nippon Kokan
Toyo Industries 3–1 Kyushu Sangyo University
Osaka University of Commerce 1–3 Fujitsu
Honda 1–0 Nissan Motors

2nd round
Furukawa Electric 3–0 Dainichi Cable Industries
Tokyo University of Agriculture 3–1 Nippon Steel
Yamaha Motors 0–1 Yomiuri
Fukuoka University 1–5 Yanmar Diesel
Fujita Industries 3–2 Waseda University
Osaka University of Health and Sport Sciences 0–1 Sumitomo Metals
Toyo Industries 1–0 Fujitsu
Honda 0–2 Mitsubishi Motors

Quarterfinals
Furukawa Electric 3–2 Tokyo University of Agriculture
Yomiuri 0–2 Yanmar Diesel
Fujita Industries 4–3 Sumitomo Metals
Toyo Industries 0–4 Mitsubishi Motors

Semifinals
Furukawa Electric 0–1 Yanmar Diesel
Fujita Industries 2–1 Mitsubishi Motors

Final

Yanmar Diesel 1–4 Fujita Industries
Fujita Industries won the championship.

References
 NHK

Emperor's Cup
Emperor's Cup
1978 in Japanese football